There are several classes of oil companies in Uganda. One class is that of oil exploration companies. The other class in one of oil marketing companies. Another class is that of oil distribution companies. Some companies fall in more than one class. There are more companies in the space than are listed on this page.

Oil exploration companies
 Tullow Oil
 Total E&P Uganda
 China National Offshore Oil Corporation
 Armour Energy Australia

Oil marketing and distribution companies
 Total M&S Uganda
 Vivo Energy Uganda
 Stabex International Limited
 Ola Energy Uganda
 Hass Petroleum Uganda Limited
 Maestro Oil and Gas Solutions (MOGAS)
 Hared Petroleum Company Limited
 Rubis Energy Uganda Limited

Other companies
 Uganda National Oil Company
 Uganda Refinery Holding Company 
 Uganda National Pipeline Company
 Albertine Graben Refinery Consortium
 J&H Internationals Group Uganda

Market share of petroleum products marketing companies in Uganda

As of February 2020, the market share among petroleum products marketing companies in Uganda was as illustrated in the table below.

By April 2022, the market share among Ugandan oil marketing companies in the country had the composition illustrated in the table below.

See also

References

External links
30 French Compnies In Uganda To Tap Into Oil And Gas Opportunities As of 4 December 2017.
Uganda: Oil and Gas Boom in 2017
Future of Ugandan oil and gas sector looks bright, Siemens says